This article covers the history of department stores and retail in Palm Springs, California, particularly in that city's downtown.

Palm Springs Plaza
Palm Springs Plaza, as it was then called, now La Plaza, opened November 1, 1936, one of the first shopping centers in Southern California with a single developer, owner and a uniform appearance, after Westwood Village (1929). It contained a parking garage on three levels with parking for 141 cars, the largest garage in Riverside County. Desmond's (department store) was an original anchor and continued to operate until 2005.

Resort stores
Bullock's, a large upscale department store on Broadway in Los Angeles, opened a Spanish Colonial-style "resort store" in the Desert Inn complex in 1930. I. Magnin followed, opening a resort store in the El Mirador resort on December 1, 1933, closing when that resort was turned into a military hospital in 1942. When Bullock's opened a full department store at 151 Palm Canyon Drive in 1947, J. W. Robinson's, another large L.A. store, took the former Bullock's location and opened its own resort store there.

Full-line and specialty department stores
After La Plaza was built, additional junior and full-line department stores started to be established on Palm Canyon Drive immediately adjacent to La Plaza. Bullock's/Bullocks Wilshire (#151, 1947–1990), J. W. Robinson's (#333, 1958–1987), and Saks Fifth Avenue (opened October 16, 1959 at No. 490), forming a large shopping district. In 1967 the Desert Fashion Plaza mall was built, I. Magnin opened there (closed 1992) and Saks closed its previous location and moved into a new larger store in the mall. Joseph Magnin Co. opened a 26,000 square foot department store in the mall in 1969, meaning that together with a Sears at 611 Palm Canyon Dr., for two decades, downtown boasted seven department stores, plus the Palm Springs Mall 1.5 miles to the east operating from 1959 to 2005.

References

Palm Springs, California